No Filter may refer to:

Film and TV
 No Filter (film), Chilean film with Paz Bascuñán

Music
 No Filter Tour, Rolling Stones 2017
 No Filter tour, 2014 concert tour by Danity Kane
 No Filter (Lil Wyte and JellyRoll album)
 No Filter (Json album)
 No Filter 2, Lil Wyte and JellyRoll collaborative album
 "No Filter", song by Hit the Lights from Summer Bones  2015
 "No Filter", song by Chris Brown from Royalty

See also